Vladimír Búřil (born 17 May 1969 in Bratislava, Czechoslovakia) is a Slovak former professional ice hockey player. Buril played with HC Slovan Bratislava in the Slovak Extraliga. Buril retired after the 2009–10 season. He is an uncle of a Canadian ice dancer, Andrew Poje.

Playing career
Buril turned professional in 1998 with HC Slovan Bratislava. He would play eleven seasons in total with Slovan Bratislava during his career. In 1994, Buril transferred to France to play for Bordeaux for two seasons. He then returned to Slovan Bratislava, where he played until the 2000/01 season, when he was transferred to EC Wilhelmshaven-Stickhausen of the Germany 2 league for the season. Buril played three further seasons in the Germany2 league, for Heilbronner Falken. Buril returned to the Slovakian league in 2004 to play for MsHK Zilina. 2005/06 was with Székesfehérvár of the IEL, then back to Zilina in 06/07 before being transferred to Podhale Nowy Targ of Poland, which won the Polish championship. In 2007/08, Buril joined the Polish TKH Torun team, but was transferred mid-season to Cracovia Krakow where he was for the second time a member of a Polish championship squad. Buril returned to TKH Torun in 2008 for two further seasons.

Buril played internationally for Czechoslovakia in the 1989 World Junior championship. He played for Slovakia in the 1994 Winter Olympics.

Career statistics

Regular season and playoffs

International

References

External links

1969 births
Living people
Fehérvár AV19 players
Boxers de Bordeaux players
Czechoslovak ice hockey defencemen
HC Slovan Bratislava players
Heilbronner EC players
Ice hockey players at the 1994 Winter Olympics
MKS Cracovia (ice hockey) players
MsHK Žilina players
Olympic ice hockey players of Slovakia
Podhale Nowy Targ players
Slovak ice hockey defencemen
Ice hockey people from Bratislava
TKH Toruń players
Expatriate ice hockey players in France
Expatriate ice hockey players in Poland
Expatriate ice hockey players in Hungary
Slovak expatriate sportspeople in France
Slovak expatriate ice hockey players in Germany
Slovak expatriate sportspeople in Poland
Slovak expatriate sportspeople in Hungary